Garcelon Field is the outdoor stadium and field of Bates College. Located in Lewiston, Maine, it is the field for Bates football, soccer, lacrosse, and various other sports.

History 

The field was completed in 1899, and is one of the oldest football pitches in the United States. It was named after the 36th Governor of Maine, and American Civil War surgeon general, Alonzo Garcelon. He was an early benefactor of the college. In 1875 prior to the completion of Garcelon Field, Bates played Tufts at a field adjacent to Rand Hall on the Bates campus for the first organized intercollegiate football game played in Maine.

Development 
In 2010, Garcelon Field had a renovation that featured a new FieldTurf surface with an aluminum grandstand for an added 1,500 fans including stadium seats in the center section. Soon after a larger press box was created and four Musco light towers for nighttime play were incorporated.

References

Bates College